Ted & Venus is a 1991 American comedy-drama film directed by Bud Cort, written by Cort and Paul Ciotti and featuring an all-star cast including Brian Thompson. The original music is composed by David Robbins.

The film was initially released theatrically in the United States on December 20, 1991, and on home video in 1993. On March 1, 2005, the film was released on DVD in Canada by Legacy Entertainment in full frame format without any bonus material. The DVD has since been discontinued, and as of 2018, there are no plans for a new DVD of the film.

Cast

 Bud Cort - Ted Whitley
 James Brolin - Max Waters
 Kim Adams - Linda Turner
 Carol Kane - Colette
 Pamella D'Pella - Gloria
 Brian Thompson as Herb
 Rhea Perlman - Grace
 Woody Harrelson - Homeless Vietnam Veteran
 Martin Mull - Ted's Attorney
 Timothy Leary - Judge William H. Converse
 Tricia O'Neil - Judge Katherine Notch
 Tony Genaro - Bailiff
 Vincent Schiavelli - Publisher
 Andrea Martin - Bag Lady
 Cassandra Peterson - Lisa
 Tracy Reiner - Shelly
 Arleen Sorkin - Marcia
 Pat McCormick - Marcia's Elderly Boyfriend
 Gena Rowlands - Mrs. Turner
 Lily Mariye - Rose
 Bettye Ackerman - Poetry Award Presenter
 Rob Moran - Patient #2
 Zoe R. Cassavetes - Waitress with Attitude
 Joe Paul - Wino
 Tamara De Treaux - Park Bench Lover
 Peter Koch - Cop #1
 Norma Maldonado - Cop #5

Reviews
 Variety.com
 Thepronegunman's Weblog
 Screaming Stoner Video

References

External links
 

1991 films
1991 comedy-drama films
American black comedy films
American comedy-drama films
American independent films
1990s English-language films
Films about stalking
Films about writers
Films set in 1974
Films set in Los Angeles
1991 directorial debut films
1990s black comedy films
1991 independent films
1990s American films